Bodzanów  is a village in the administrative district of Gmina Głuchołazy, within Nysa County, Opole Voivodeship, in south-western Poland, close to the Czech border.

The village has an approximate population of 1,500.

References

Villages in Nysa County